The GE U33C is a 6-axle diesel-electric locomotive built by GE Transportation Systems between January 1968 and January 1975. 375 examples of this locomotive were built for 11 North American railroads and one construction contractor.

Original owners

References

External links

 Thompson, J. David. GE U33C Original Owners.

U33C
C-C locomotives
Diesel-electric locomotives of the United States
Railway locomotives introduced in 1968
Freight locomotives
Standard gauge locomotives of the United States
Southern Pacific Railroad locomotives
Atchison, Topeka and Santa Fe Railway locomotives
Milwaukee Road locomotives
Great Northern Railway (United States) locomotives
Northern Pacific Railway locomotives
Locomotives of Southern Railway (U.S.)